School Girl Distortional Addict is the second studio album by Japanese rock band Number Girl, released on July 23, 1999. It peaked at number 50 on the Oricon Albums Chart.

Track listing

Charts

References

External links
 

1999 albums
Number Girl albums